General elections were held in Japan on 22 October 2017. Voting took place in all Representatives constituencies of Japan – 289 single-member districts and eleven proportional blocks – in order to appoint all 465 members (down from 475) of the House of Representatives, the lower house of the then 707-member bicameral National Diet of Japan. Incumbent Prime Minister Shinzō Abe's governing coalition of the Liberal Democratic Party (LDP) and the Komeito party retained their seats in signs of what was perceived as weak opposition. The PM won his fourth term in office and held on to the two-thirds supermajority in order to implement policies on revising the war-renouncing Article 9 of the Japanese Constitution.

The snap elections were called in the midst of the North Korea missile threat and with the largest opposition party, the Democratic Party, in disarray. Just hours before Abe's announcement of the snap election on 25 September, Governor of Tokyo Yuriko Koike launched a new conservative reformist party Kibō no Tō, the Party of Hope, which was seen as a viable alternative to the ruling coalition. It soon led to the dissolution of the Democratic Party and its party members defecting to the Kibō no Tō. However, the liberal wing of the Democratic Party, whose members Koike refused to nominate, formed the Constitutional Democratic Party of Japan (CDP) led by Yukio Edano, splitting the opposition in half. The elections turned into a three-way contest as the CDP joined with the Japanese Communist Party and Social Democratic Party on a common platform opposing the constitutional revision. While Kibō no Tō fell short of expectation, the CDP surged in the polls in the last days before the elections and beat Kibō no Tō to emerge as the largest opposition party.

Despite being disrupted by Typhoon Lan, the elections saw a slight increase in turnout rate of 53.68 percent but still was the second lowest in postwar Japan. The lowest ever turnout was recorded in 2014. They were also the first elections after the voting age was lowered from 20 to 18. Abe also became the first Prime Minister to win three consecutive general elections since 1953 and the first LDP leader to do so. He became the longest-serving Prime Minister in the history of the country in August 2020, but resigned shortly after achieving this due to health issues.

Background 
The House of Representatives has a fixed term of four years. Under the postwar constitution drafted in 1947, the interpretation of Article 7 states that the cabinet may instruct the Emperor to dissolve the House of Representatives before the end of term at will. Elections must be held within 40 days after dissolution. In June 2015, the Public Office Election Law was amended to lower the voting age from 20 to 18 years of age.

As of June 2015, the largest opposition party Democratic Party of Japan was reportedly preparing a roster of up to 250 candidates so as to be prepared in the event that the next general election was to be held alongside the House of Councillors election in the summer of 2016, before it merged with the Japan Innovation Party to form the Democratic Party in March 2016. The Democratic Party suffered a considerable defeat at the hands of the ruling coalition in the election, in which the Abe government took almost two-thirds of the seats.

In January 2017, Tokyo Governor Yuriko Koike established a new local party, Tomin First, to challenge the establishment Liberal Democratic Party in the Tokyo metropolitan election to be held in July. Tomin First won a resounding victory in the election, which came in the wake of the Moritomo Gakuen and Kake Gakuen scandals calling into question the propriety of the Abe government's decision making. After the election, Defense Minister Tomomi Inada resigned in connection with another scandal involving the Japan Self-Defense Forces concealing evidence of a battle in South Sudan. Meanwhile, the main national opposition Democratic Party was severely hurt by the resignation of its leader Renho in July, as well as several high-profile defections.

The government of Prime Minister Shinzo Abe began publicly discussing the possibility of an election in mid-September 2017, as the North Korea crisis was ongoing. Continuing the momentum of her Tokyo election victory, Koike announced the formation of a new national political party, Kibō no Tō (Party of Hope), on 25 September. Abe called the general election just hours later on the same day. Soon after the Party of Hope was established, Democratic Party leader Seiji Maehara sought to merge with Kibō no Tō. Maehara's decision was strongly criticised by the liberal wing of the party, whose candidacies were rejected by Koike. The liberal wing surrounding the deputy president Yukio Edano announced the formation of the Constitutional Democratic Party of Japan on 2 October 2017. Opposition politicians claim Abe called the election partly to evade further questioning in parliament over his alleged misuse of power in securing approval for a veterinary college campus in Imabari.

One wedge issue between the two major coalitions is the scheduled consumption tax hike in October 2019. The LDP coalition advocates keeping the tax hike and using the funds for child care and education, while the Kibo coalition advocates freezing the tax hike. Nonetheless, Koike stated on 8 October that she was open to the option of a grand coalition with the LDP.

The LDP fielded 332 candidates, while Komeito fielded 53, Kibō no Tō fielded 235, and Nippon Ishin fielded 52. The Constitutional Democratic Party, Japanese Communist Party and Social Democratic Party joined forces to support a total number of 342 candidates on the common platform of opposing the revision the pacifist Article 9 of the Constitution of Japan and the new national security legislation.

Several U.S.-Japan policy experts, including James Zumwalt and Michael Green, opined in October that the election was unlikely to have a major impact on policy as the LDP was expected to retain control; however, there was anxiety about the prospect of a leadership vacuum if Abe was eventually forced to resign as head of the LDP.

Contesting parties and candidates

Ruling coalition
 The Liberal Democratic Party (LDP), the conservative party led by Prime Minister Shinzō Abe who has been in power since the 2012 House of Representative election. The LDP currently enjoys the two-thirds majority with its coalition partner Komeito which allows the government to push forward the revision of the war-renouncing Article 9 of the Japanese Constitution.
 Komeito, a nominally Buddhist party led by Natsuo Yamaguchi, is the junior coalition partner of the incumbent government. Holding 35 seats in the House of Representatives, the party is considered as social conservative and closely associated with the Soka Gakkai religious movement.

Koike's coalition
 Kibō no Tō, also known as the Party of Hope, is the brand new conservative reformist party launched by Yuriko Koike, former LDP minister and incumbent Governor of Tokyo, on 25 September 2017 ahead of the general election. The new party attracted former members of the LDP as well as the conservative wing of the Democratic Party, the largest opposition party at the time, led by Seiji Maehara to join with the aims of overthrowing the Abe government. Three members of the Ichirō Ozawa's Liberal Party also decided run under Koike's banner. Despite being tipped as the first Japan's woman Prime Minister, Koike has expressed no intention to run in the general election and stated that her party would not name a prime ministerial candidate during the election. The party has promised to freeze the planned consumption tax increase and promote debate on the constitutional revision.
 Nippon Ishin no Kai, previously known as Initiatives from Osaka, is a Kansai-based party led by Governor of Osaka Ichirō Matsui. It split from the Japan Innovation Party in 2015. Having similar policies with Kibō no Tō, the party has agreed to cooperate with Koike in the coming election.

Pacifist coalition
 The Japanese Communist Party (JCP), the left-wing party led by Kazuo Shii, saw its recent resurgence in the 2014 House of Representative election due to its firm pacifist stance against the revision of Article 9 of the Constitution. The party currently is the second largest opposition party, holding 21 seats in the House of Representatives. The party forms an alliance with two other left-leaning parties, the Constitutional Democrats and the Social Democrats, and plans to field 243 candidates.
 The Constitutional Democratic Party of Japan (CDP), a brand new centre-left social liberal party formed by Yukio Edano on 2 October 2017 by the liberal wing of the Democratic Party, the then largest opposition party, after Kibō no Tō refused to nominate the liberal candidates of the Democratic Party when the party leader Seiji Maehara decided to join Kibō no Tō with the party. The party calls for Japan to phase out nuclear power, opposes the constitutional revision and the new national security legislation with two other left-leaning opposition parties. The party plans to field 78 candidates in the coming election.
 The Social Democratic Party (SDP) is the centre-left social democratic party led by Tadatomo Yoshida, which currently holds 2 seats in the House of Representatives. It opposes the revision of the pacifist Article 9 of the Constitution, and forms an alliance with two other left-leaning to stop the constitutional revisionists from winning a two-thirds majority.

Other parties
 The Party for Japanese Kokoro (PJK), formerly called the Party for Future Generations, currently holds no seat in the House of Representatives after its two members left to rejoin the Liberal Democratic Party in 2015. It is led by Masashi Nakano after its former leader Kyoko Nakayama left to join Kibō no Tō in late September and provides confidence and supply to the Abe cabinet. The party was formed by the right-wing nationalist wing led by Shintarō Ishihara who split from the Japan Restoration Party in 2014.

Gender representation 
Fewer than 20% of the 1,180 candidates that ran in the election were women. 9% of current elected figures are women, Japan ranks 165th out of 193 countries on this aspect.

Opinion polls

Voting intention (PR blocks)

Voting intention (districts)

Party approval

Preferred prime minister

Preferred outcome

Cabinet approval / disapproval ratings

Results

By prefecture

By PR block

Notable defeats

Representatives

Members of House of Representatives elected from single-seat constituency

By-election

The by-elections in Tokyo-9th, Kanagawa-3rd, Hiroshima-3rd and Shimane-2nd district were not held due to the remaining term of the member of the House of Representatives.

Members of House of Representatives elected from proportional representation block

People who were elected in PR following the resignation of another member of the House of Representatives

Aftermath

Reactions and analysis
The success of the CDP in surpassing the Kibō no Tō in the number of seats and becoming the official opposition party was surprising. It presents a potential challenge for the ruling coalition to pass the constitutional amendment of Article 9, which was one of the main issues of the 2017 general election that was supported by Koike but opposed by the pacifist coalition. With the super-majority in both the upper and the lower house, the ruling coalition are expected to pass other legislation without much resistance. In a post-election conference, Prime Minister Shinzō Abe was optimistic about moving forward, stating that the victory was the first time the LDP have "won three consecutive victories" under the same party leader. The landslide victory achieved by the LDP campaign has been observed as not completely related to the popularity of Shinzo Abe, as the victory was also significantly influenced by the disconnect between the oppositions, notably the failure of Koike and the pacifist coalition to unite over many election issues.

Investiture vote
A special Diet session was convened on 1 November to elect the next prime minister. Abe was re-elected with 312 and 151 votes in the House of Representatives and House of Councillors respectively. The new cabinet was formed later on the day.

See also
Constitution of Japan
Elections in Japan

Notes

References

Japan
2017 elections in Japan
October 2017 events in Japan
General elections in Japan